Ironies of Automation is a research paper written by Lisanne Bainbridge and published in Automatica in 1983, and has been widely recognized as a pioneering statement of the problems inherent in automation. Barry Strauch analyzes the paper's significance, observing that by November 2016 it had attracted 1800 citations, far beyond other influential works on the topic, and that "The number of citations of Bainbridge’s work, large as it is, is also increasing at a considerable rate." Retrospectives on "Ironies of Automation" and its significance have appeared in both IEEE and ACM publications.

Author 
Lisanne Bainbridge is a cognitive psychologist, active in human factors research between the late 1960s and 1998. She obtained a doctorate in 1972 for work on process controllers and went on to author various research on mental load, process operations, and related topics. She taught at University of Reading and University College London (See the references in Strauch for a partial bibliography, or her home page link below.)  

Little is known of Bainbridge's biography or present whereabouts, nor are any images of her apparently extant.

See https://www.complexcognition.co.uk/p/home.html, including note on relation to Rasmussen's work.

References

External links
 Ironies of Automation direct access for convenience; not paywalled and accessible as of 2021 Jun. 

Academic journal articles